Daniel Jacobs (born February 3, 1987) is an American professional boxer. He is a two-time middleweight world champion, having held the IBF title from 2018 to 2019 and the WBA (Regular) title from 2014 to 2017. Nicknamed the "Miracle Man," Jacobs' career was almost cut short in 2011 due to osteosarcoma, a rare form of bone cancer. He went on to make a full recovery after spending 19 months out of the sport, meanwhile recovering from severe operation-induced injuries generally perceived as crippling.

As of September 2021, Jacobs is ranked as the world's eighth best active super middleweight by The Ring magazine, sixth the Transnational Boxing Rankings Board and third by BoxRec. He is particularly known for his exceptional punching power, with an 82.8% knockout-to-win ratio, and is stylistically considered an all-around fighter with good movement and hand speed.

Early life
Jacobs was born and raised in Brownsville, Brooklyn. He was raised by his mother, Yvette Jacobs, his grandmother, Cordelia Jacobs, and his aunts. Jacobs graduated from Erasmus High School.

Amateur career
As an amateur boxer, Jacobs recorded 137 wins and 7 losses. In 2003, Jacobs won the Junior Olympics national championship at 154 pounds. In 2004, Jacobs won the United States national champion in the 19–and–under division, a PAL national championship, and a National Golden Gloves welterweight championship. In 2005, he won his second PAL national championship and also won the National Golden Gloves middleweight championship. In July 2005 he faced Russian Matvey Korobov at the preliminaries of the 2005 Boxing World Cup, and lost via a third round stoppage. In 2006, Jacobs won the United States Amateur middleweight championship, decisioning Shawn Porter in the finals, 32–21. During his amateur career, Jacobs won four New York Golden Gloves championships. He almost qualified for the U.S. Olympic team for the 2008 Summer Olympics, beating Dominic Wade and Shawn Porter (twice) en route, but twice lost the North American Olympic Qualifier Super Middleweight finale to Shawn Estrada.

Professional career

Early career

Jacobs made his professional boxing debut on the undercard of Floyd Mayweather Jr. vs. Ricky Hatton, which took place on December 8, 2007, at the MGM Grand in Las Vegas, Nevada. In that fight, he defeated Jose Jesus Hurtado by first round technical knockout in just 29 seconds. Jacobs signed with Golden Boy Promotions and often fought on the undercard of super-fights. He was regarded as a blue-chip prospect.

On April 27, 2009, Jacobs agreed to replace junior middleweight James Kirkland, who was arrested on a gun charge, to fight Mike Walker, who was coming off a victory over two-time world title challenger Antwun Echols. The fight took place on May 2, 2009, at the MGM Grand in Las Vegas, and Jacobs won by unanimous decision with scores of 80–72 from two judges and 79–73 from the other. On August 22, 2009, Jacobs defeated Ishe Smith by unanimous decision to win the NABO middleweight title.

Jacobs vs. Pirog
On July 31, 2010, Jacobs faced undefeated Russian Dmitry Pirog for the vacant WBO middleweight championship. The belt had last belonged to Sergio Martínez, who was stripped due to not complying with the WBO's rules. The fight took place at the Mandalay Bay Events Center. Pirog was a 3-1 underdog going into the fight. Jacobs was up on the cards when he was caught with a massive right hand against the ropes and knocked out in the 5th round, handing him his first career loss. After the fight, Pirog said "After the second round, I knew I was good. I hurt him in the second and I knew I could come back and do it again."

Jacobs won his next two fights before he was diagnosed with osteosarcoma.

Return after cancer treatment
On October 20, 2012, having fully recovered from cancer, Jacobs made a successful return to professional boxing with a first-round knockout victory over Josh Luteran.

ESPN.com reported that the scheduled February 9, 2013 bout between Danny Garcia and Zab Judah at the Barclays Center in Brooklyn, New York was moved to April 27, 2013 because of a rib injury sustained by Garcia. With Jacobs penciled in on the undercard fight for this event, his fight moved to April 27 as well. Jacobs defeated Keenan Collins with a round 4 knockout on that date.

On August 19, 2013, Jacobs captured the WBC Continental Americas middleweight title via third-round knockout of Giovanni Lorenzo during the premiere of Golden Boy Live! on Fox Sports 1.

WBA (Regular) middleweight champion
On August 9, 2014, Jacobs won the vacant WBA (Regular) middleweight title with a 5th-round TKO over Jarrod Fletcher at the Barclays Center in Brooklyn, New York. Jacobs dropped Fletcher in round 1 with a left hook and in round 5 with a right cross. With the win, Jacobs became a world champion. "It feels so great to win this belt," Jacobs said. "It's the greatest moment in my life." Jacobs stated that he wanted to fight Peter Quillin next.

Jacobs' first defense came against Caleb Truax, whom he comfortably outboxed for eleven rounds, until he scored a knockdown and got a stoppage on round 12.

Jacobs' then fought former light middleweight titlist Sergio Mora. Jacobs started the fight tentatively, but was able to time and counter Mora with a right hook that put the latter on the canvas. Mora was able to return the favor when Jacobs tried to apply pressure to get a quick stoppage. The fight would then be stopped when Mora retired after injuring his right foot in round 2. After the fight, Jacobs once again said he was looking to fight Quillin.

Jacobs vs. Quillin, Mora II 
On December 5, 2015 Jacobs beat Peter Quillin by TKO in the first round. Jacobs landed a lead right hand that caught Quillin flush on the temple and heavily rocked him. Jacobs then attempted to finish the fight landing non stop hard combinations the whole round. He landed another big punch that saw Quillin staggering over to the ropes, at which point the referee saw that Quillin was highly disorientated and waved the fight off with no complaint from Quillin. Many, including Floyd Mayweather, felt that the fight was halted too early.

In September 2016, Jacobs rematched Sergio Mora. He complained that the fight was a step back for him, as he thought he'd beaten Mora convincingly the first time. On fight night, Jacobs scored two flash knockdowns in rounds 4 and 5 before getting a dominant TKO win. Mora went down three times in round 7 before the referee halted the contest.

Jacobs vs. Golovkin

Jacobs was engaged in negotiations with WBC, IBF, IBO and WBA (Super) middleweight champion Gennady Golovkin through 2016. Jacobs was Golovkin's mandatory as both fighters held WBA belts, as part of the WBA's stated plan to unify their belts. WBA president Gilberto Mendoza confirmed in an email to RingTV that a deal had to be made by 5pm on December 7 or a purse bid would be held on December 19 in Panama. Later that day, the WBA announced a purse bid would be scheduled with a minimum bid of $400,000, with Golovkin receiving 75% and Jacobs 25%. Although purse bids were announced, Loeffler stated he would carry on negotiations, hopeful that a deal would be reached before the purse bid. On December 17, terms were finally agreed and it was officially announced that the fight would take place at Madison Square Garden in New York City on March 18, 2017. The fight would be shown on HBO PPV.

At the official weigh-in, a day before the fight, Golovkin tipped the scales at 159.6 lb, while Jacobs weighed 159.8 lb. Jacobs declined to compete for the IBF title by skipping a fight-day weight check. Jacobs weighed 182 lb on fight night, 12 more than Golovkin.

In front of a sell out crowd of 19,939, the fight went the full 12 rounds. This was the first time that Golovkin fought 12 rounds in his professional career. Golovkin's ring control, constant forward pressure and effective jab lead to a 115–112, 115–112, and 114–113 unanimous decision victory, ending his 23 fight knockout streak which dated back to November 2008. In the fourth round, Golovkin dropped Jacobs with a short right hand along the ropes for a flash knockdown. Jacobs recovered, but Golovkin controlled most of the middle rounds. Jacobs was effective in switching between orthodox and southpaw stance, but remained on the back foot. Both boxers were warned once in the fight by referee Charlie Fitch for rabbit punching. According to Compubox punch stats, Golovkin landed 231 of 615 punches (38%) which was more than Jacobs who landed 175 of 541 (32%). Jacobs thought he had won the fight by two rounds and attributed the loss due to the potential big money fight that is Golovkin vs. Canelo Álvarez. Jacobs also stated after being knocked down, he told Golovkin, "he'd have to kill me." In the post-fight interview, Golovkin said, “I’m a boxer, not a killer. I respect the game.” Before revenue shares, it was reported that Golovkin would earn at least $2.5 million compared to Jacobs $1.75 million.

Signing with Matchroom Boxing

Jacobs vs. Arias
In September 2017, it was announced that Jacobs had signed with promotional outfit Matchroom Boxing. Jacobs had worked without a promotional outfit since his return. The deal would see Jacobs' fights be televised on HBO. It was later announced that Jacobs would face Luis Arias on November 11 at the Nassau Coliseum. Jacobs dominated Arias from beginning to end and scored a flash knockdown in round 11 to win a unanimous decision 118–109, 119–108, and 120–107. This was Jacobs' first decision win in a 12-round bout. According to CompuBox Stats, Jacobs landed 184 of 581 punches thrown (32%), while Arias landed 88 of 318 (28%). Jacobs outlanded Arias in every single round. The bout averaged 706,000 and peaked at 765,000 viewers.

Jacobs vs. Sulęcki 
In February 2018, after weeks of speculation, it was officially announced that Jacobs would fight Polish boxer Maciej Sulęcki (26-0, 10 KOs) on April 28 at the Barclays Center in New York City on HBO. On March 30, the WBA elevated the fight to be an eliminator for their middleweight title. Jacobs won 116-111, 117-110 and 115-112 on three judges' scorecards.

The fight averaged 811,000 viewers and peaked at 874,000 viewers.

Jacobs vs. Derevyanchenko 
On April 27, the IBF ordered Gennady Golovkin to defend his title against Ukrainian contender Sergiy Derevyanchenko (12-0, 10 KOs). This came after the Golovkin vs. Alvarez rematch broke down and Golovkin decided to fight Vanes Martirosyan on May 5. The IBF allowed Golovkin to fight Martirosyan as long as he would fight Derevyanchenko afterwards. On June 6, Golovkin was stripped of his IBF world title due to not adhering to the IBF rules. The IBF granted Golovkin an exception to fight Martirosyan although they would not sanction the fight, however told Golovkin's team to start negotiating and fight mandatory challenger Derevyanchenko by August 3, 2018. The IBF released a statement in detail. On June 25, the IBF ordered a purse bid to take place for Jacobs vs. Derevyanchenko on June 11. On July 20, according to Ringtv, the fight would take place for the vacant IBF middleweight title on November 10, 2018 at the Nassau Veterans Memorial Coliseum, Uniondale, New York.

Jacobs vs. Canelo 
In his next fight, Jacobs faced pound-for-pound great Canelo Alvarez, in a bid to unify his IBF title with the WBA, WBC and The Ring middleweight titles. In a mostly tactical bout, both fighters managed to avoid a lot of punches. Canelo proved to be the more elusive and efficient of the two, winning the fight via unanimous decision, 116-112, 115-113 and 115-113 to unify the middleweight belts.

Jacobs vs. Chavez Jr 
On December 20, 2019, Jacobs faced Julio Cesar Chavez Jr. Chavez Jr started the fight well, but after two rounds Jacobs figured out his own plan of attack, and started to land on Chavez Jr and to hurt him. This prompted Chavez Jr to quit after five rounds, due to an alleged nose and hand injury.

Jacobs vs. Rosado 
In his following bout, Jacobs faced Gabriel Rosado. In a largely underwhelming fight, Jacobs, who came in as the heavy favorite, had a rough time against Rosado, and scored a narrow split-decision win. Two of the judges had it 115-113 for Jacobs, while the third judge had it 115-113 for Rosado.

Personal life
In May 2011, Jacobs was diagnosed with osteosarcoma, a life-threatening form of bone cancer. After receiving successful treatment at NewYork–Presbyterian Hospital he returned to the ring. Jacobs has a son.

Professional boxing record

Viewership

Pay-per-view bouts

Subscription sports streaming service bouts

References

External links

Daniel Jacobs profile at Premier Boxing Champions
Daniel Jacobs - Profile, News Archive & Current Rankings at Box.Live

1987 births
Living people
People from Brownsville, Brooklyn
Super-middleweight boxers
Winners of the United States Championship for amateur boxers
National Golden Gloves champions
Sportspeople from Brooklyn
African-American boxers
American male boxers
World Boxing Association champions
World middleweight boxing champions
Boxers from New York City
International Boxing Federation champions
21st-century African-American sportspeople
20th-century African-American people